8mm is a 1999 crime thriller film directed by Joel Schumacher and written by Andrew Kevin Walker. A German–American production, the film stars Nicolas Cage as a private investigator who delves into the world of snuff films. Joaquin Phoenix, James Gandolfini, Peter Stormare, and Anthony Heald appear in supporting roles.

The film received negative reviews, but was a box office success. It was followed by a sequel, 8mm 2, in 2005, although the storylines of the two films are not related.

Plot
Private investigator Tom Welles is contacted by Daniel Longdale, attorney for wealthy widow Mrs. Christian, whose husband has recently died. While clearing out her late husband's safe, she and Longdale find an 8mm movie which appears to depict a real murder of a girl, but Mrs. Christian wants to know for certain. Welles is instructed by Longdale and Mrs. Christian not to reproduce the snuff film in any way, and to not tell anyone else about the investigation.

After looking through missing persons files, Welles discovers the girl is Mary Ann Mathews and visits her mother, Janet, in North Carolina. She allows Welles to search her house, and he finds Mary Ann's diary, in which she says she went to Hollywood to become a film star. He asks Mrs. Mathews if she wants to know the truth, even if it is unbearable. She says that she wants to know what happened to her daughter.

In Hollywood, with the help of adult video store employee Max California, Welles delves into the world of underground (and sometimes illegal) fetish pornography.  He attempts to find out if snuff films are real, or if there is anyone in this underworld who was connected to this film. Contact with sleazy talent scout Eddie Poole leads them to director Dino Velvet, whose violent pornographic films star a masked man known as "Machine" who rapes and tortures women. To gain more evidence, Welles pretends to be a client interested in commissioning a hardcore BDSM film to be directed by Velvet and starring Machine. Velvet agrees and arranges a meeting in New York City.

The meeting turns out to be an ambush. Longdale and Poole appear and hold Welles at gunpoint. It is now clear that the film was real; Mr. Christian contacted Longdale to procure a snuff film, and being unable to find one, he commissioned Velvet and Poole to make one.  Velvet and Machine produce a bound and beaten Max, whom they abducted to force Welles to bring them the only surviving copy of the film. As Longdale and Welles go to Welles' car to retrieve the film, Longdale admits that he never thought Welles would get as far as he did, and just wanted to placate Mrs. Christian with the investigation. Once he delivers it, Longdale and Velvet burn it and kill California. As they are about to kill Welles, he tells them that Mr. Christian paid $1 million for the film; Velvet, Poole, and Machine received $50,000 and Longdale kept the major portion. In an ensuing fight, Velvet and Longdale are both killed; Welles wounds Machine and escapes.

Welles calls Mrs. Christian to tell her his discoveries and recommends going to the police, to which she agrees. Arriving at her estate, Welles is told that Mrs. Christian committed suicide after hearing the news. She left envelopes for the Mathews family and Welles: it contains the rest of his payment and a note reading, "Try to forget us". Welles warns his already frantic wife of the impending danger and to seek shelter in a location known only to them, and hands her his half of the money.

Welles decides to seek justice for Mary Ann by killing the remaining people involved. Welles returns to Hollywood and tracks down Poole. He takes him to the shooting location and tries to kill him, but he is hesitant. He calls Mrs. Mathews to tell her about her daughter and asks for her permission to punish those responsible. Mrs. Mathews breaks down hysterically once presented with the truth, but affirms that she loved her daughter. With that, Welles returns and beats Poole to death with his pistol, burning his body and the pornography from his car. Welles discovers Machine's address in New York, and attacks him at his home. Welles unmasks him, revealing an unremarkable, bespectacled man named George. He reveals to Welles that his sadism did not result from neglect or childhood abuse; he kills people simply because he enjoys it. They struggle, and Welles kills him.

After returning to his family, Welles breaks down in front of his wife as he tries to process all of the evil that he had seen over the course of the investigation. Months later, Welles receives a letter from Mrs. Mathews, thanking him and relating her gratitude for the fact that, in spite of everything, she and Welles were the only people who really cared about Mary Ann.

Cast

Production
Principal Photography began February 1998 in Miami, Florida. And filming also took place in New York City, and Sony Pictures Studios, Culver City, California

Reception

Box office
8mm opened in 2,730 theaters in North America and made $14,252,888 in its opening weekend with an average of $6,013 per theater ranking number 1 at the box office. The film made $36,663,315 domestically and $59,955,384 internationally for a total of $96,618,699, more than double its $40 million production budget.

Critical response
The film received negative reviews from critics. It has a rating of 23% on review aggregator website Rotten Tomatoes based on 84 reviews with an average rating of 4.2/10. The consensus states that "its sadistic violence is unappealing and is lacking in suspense and mystery." The film also has a score of 19 out of 100 on Metacritic based on 20 reviews indicating "overwhelming dislike." Audiences surveyed by CinemaScore gave the film a grade of "C−" on scale of A+ to F. Derek Elley of Variety criticized the film, stating that "8MM is a movie that keeps jumping the gate and finally unravels all over the floor." Peter Travers for Rolling Stone wrote that the film "aims for a psychological depth that the script can't sustain."

Roger Ebert was one of the film's admirers and gave the film three stars out of four, stating on his website "I know some audience members will be appalled by this film, as many were by Seven. It is a very hard R that would doubtless have been NC-17 if it had come from an indie instead of a big studio with clout. But it is a real film. Not a slick exploitation exercise with all the trappings of depravity but none of the consequences. Not a film where moral issues are forgotten in the excitement of an action climax. Yes, the hero is an ordinary man who finds himself able to handle violent situations, but that's not the movie's point. The last two words of the screenplay are "save me" and by the time they're said, we know what they mean."

Soundtrack
The film score was composed by Mychael Danna. It was released on CD by Chapter III in 1999, with a total of 20 tracks:
 "The Projector" (1:20)
 "The House" (2:05)
 "The Call" (1:44)
 "The Film" (1:10)
 "Cindy" (0:56)
 "Missing Persons" (4:46)
 "What Would You Choose" (3:11)
 "Hollywood" (2:51)
 "Unsee" (1:20)
 "Dance With the Devil" (5:36)
 "The Third Man" (1:14)
 "Loft" (1:56)
 "No Answer" (1:47)
 "I Know All About..." (1:41)
 "366 Hoyt Ave." (1:46)
 "Scene of the Crime" (5:52)
 "Machine" (3:30)
 "Rainstorm" (3:49)
 "Home" (1:32)
 "Dear Mr. Wells" (1:54)

See also 
 8mm 2
 Hardcore
 The Cutting Room

References

External links

 
 
 
 
 

1999 films
1999 thriller films
1990s English-language films
American detective films
American neo-noir films
American thriller films
BDSM in films
Columbia Pictures films
Films about pornography
Films about snuff films
Films about violence against women
Films directed by Joel Schumacher
Films scored by Mychael Danna
Films shot in Florida
Films shot in Los Angeles
Films shot in New York (state)
Films shot in Pennsylvania
Films with screenplays by Andrew Kevin Walker
English-language German films
German detective films
German neo-noir films
German thriller films
1990s American films
1990s German films